Lale or Laleh may refer to:

Geography
Laleh, Iran, a village in Kurdistan Province, Iran
Lale, Bulgaria, a village in Southern Bulgaria

Given names

Lale
 Lale Akgün (born 1953), Turkish-German politician (SPD)
 Lale Andersen (1905–1972), German singer
 Lale Aytaman, Turkish politician
 Lale Drekalov (fl. 1608–1614), Montenegrin chieftain
 Lale Karci (born 1969), Turkish-German actress and model
 Lale Müldür (born 1956), Turkish poet
 Lale Oraloğlu (1924–2007), Turkish actress and screenwriter
 Lale Orta (born 1960), Turkish football referee and academic
 Lale Sokolov (1916–2006), the tattooist of Auschwitz
 Lale Yavaş (born 1978), Turkish-Swiss actress

Laleh
 Laleh (singer) (born 1982), Swedish musician and actress, better known by her mononym "Laleh"
 Laleh Bakhtiar (born 1938), Iranian-American Muslim author and translator
 Ladan and Laleh Bijani (1974–2003), Iranian conjoined twin
 Laleh Khadivi, Iranian-American novelist and filmmaker
 Laleh Khalili, Iranian-American political scientist
 Laleh Khorramian (born 1974), Iranian-American visual artist
 Laleh Seddigh (born 1977), Iranian race car driver

Surname
 David Lale (Australian cellist) (born 1962), Australian cellist
 David Lale (British cellist) (born 1981), British cellist
 Georgia Lale (born 1989), Greek visual artist
 Kostas Lales (born 1990), Greek visual artist
 Petros Lales (born 1992), Greek visual artist
 Charis Lales (born 1952), Greek visual artist
 Nuray Lale (born 1962), Turkish-German writer and translator
 Horace Percy Lale (1886–1955), British Army officer and World War I flying ace

Media
 Laleh (album), the debut album by the Iranian-Swedish musician Laleh Pourkarim

See also
 La La (disambiguation)